Herman James (February 25, 1943 – October 2, 2010) was an American educator who served as the 5th president of Glassboro State College, later Rowan College of New Jersey, and then Rowan University in Glassboro, New Jersey from 1984 to 1998. During his tenure as president, Rowan University received a $100 million gift from Henry Rowan and his wife Betty. At the time, it was the largest ever gift by a private individual to a public university. Following his retirement as university president in 1998, James continued to serve as a professor until 2007. James died in Voorhees, New Jersey on October 2, 2010. In 2012, the Education Hall at Rowan University was named Dr. Herman D James Hall in his honor.

References

1943 births
2010 deaths
Educators from New Jersey
African Americans in New Jersey
Rowan University faculty
Heads of universities and colleges in the United States